Omar Alexis Moreno Galindo (born November 1, 1989) is a Mexican football manager and former player. He was born in Mexico City.

During his career as a footballer, he played for only two teams in the Tercera División de México, San Mateo Atenco and Tultitlán. Subsequently, began his career on the bench in clubs Panteras de Lindavista and Selva Cañera, and later went on to collaborate with Alebrijes de Oaxaca, where he became the youngest technical assistant in Mexican football.

In June 2019, Moreno began his career as technical director, being named as the first person in charge of that position in La Paz F.C., team that debuted that year in the Serie B de México. On July 1, 2020, Moreno was appointed as coach of Mineros de Zacatecas, team that plays in the Liga de Expansión MX.

References 

1989 births
Living people
Mexican footballers
Mexican football managers
Mineros de Zacatecas managers
Footballers from Mexico City
Association footballers not categorized by position